Rusangano Family are a rap trio from Limerick, Ireland.

Career
Rusangano Family were formed in Limerick in 2014. The band name derives from a Shona word meaning "togetherness", "organization" or "family."

Their members are:
 God Knows (MC) — Munyaradzi GodKnows Jonas, a native of Zimbabwe
MuRli (poet and wordsmith) — Murli Boevi, a native of Togo
MynameisjOhn (producer, DJ) — John Lillis, a native of Ennis

Their first album Let The Dead Bury The Dead, won the Choice Music Prize in 2016. Entertainment.ie named it among the top 10 Irish albums of the decade for the 2010s.

Discography

Albums
Let the Dead Bury the Dead (2016)

References

External links 

Musical groups from Limerick (city)
2014 establishments in Ireland
Togolese musicians
Irish hip hop groups
Zimbabwean rappers
Black Irish people
Irish musical trios